The 1987 CONCACAF Champions' Cup was the 23rd edition of the annual international club football competition held in the CONCACAF region (North America, Central America and the Caribbean), the CONCACAF Champions' Cup. It determined that year's club champion of association football in the CONCACAF region and was played from 31 March 1987 till 30 September 1987.

The teams were split into 2 zones, North/Central America and Caribbean, (as North and Central America sections combined to qualify one team for the final), each one qualifying the winner to the final tournament.

Mexican club América beat Trinidadian team Defence Force 3–1 on aggregate, becoming CONCACAF champions for the second time in their history.

North/Central American Zone

North section

San Pedro Yugoslavs withdrew; both legs officially awarded 2-0 to América.*
América and CF Monterrey qualified to Semi-Finals.

Central section

First round

Real España and Olimpia advance to the second round.

Second round
Group 1

Played in Tegucigalpa, Honduras

*Olimpia and Herediano advance to the third round group stage.

Group 2

Played in San Salvador, El Salvador

*Saprissa and Real España advance to the third round group stage.

Third round

Played at Estadio Nacional - San José, Costa Rica.

*Olimpia and Saprissa advance to the Semi-finals.

North/Central American semi-finals

América and CF Monterrey advance to the North/Central American Final.

North/Central American Final

Club América advance to the CONCACAF Final.

Caribbean Zone

First round

Defence Force on a bye, to the second round.
Golden Star, Franciscain, L'Etoile de Morne-à-l'Eau,VSADC and Trintoc advance to the second round.

Second round

L'Etoile de Morne-à-l'Eau possibly withdrew, after series.*
Defence Force and Trintoc advance to the Caribbean Zone final round.

Final round

Defence Force advance to the CONCACAF Final.

Final

First leg

Second leg 

América won 3–1 on points (3–1 on aggregate).

Champion

References

1
CONCACAF Champions' Cup
c
c